The Stewart Avenue Bridge is a historic structure located in Mason City, in the north-central part of the U.S. state of Iowa. This span replaced bowstring arch-truss bridge at this residential location. The Iowa State Highway Commission had the plans completed by November 1913, although the city did not petition the county to have it built until February 1914. N.M. Stark and Company of Des Moines had the low bid at $12,775, which included the removal of the old bridge. Charles Smith provided the fill for the bridge, which opened in August 1914. It was listed on the National Register of Historic Places in 1998.

See also
 
 
 
 
 List of bridges on the National Register of Historic Places in Iowa
 National Register of Historic Places listings in Cerro Gordo County, Iowa

References

Bridges completed in 1914
Arch bridges in Iowa
Bridges in Cerro Gordo County, Iowa
National Register of Historic Places in Mason City, Iowa
Road bridges on the National Register of Historic Places in Iowa
Buildings and structures in Mason City, Iowa